Rugby League Charity Shield may refer to:

Rugby League Charity Shield (Great Britain)
Rugby League Charity Shield (Australia)